Tábora is a Spanish surname. As with other such surnames, it is often written without diacritics as Tabora.

Notable people
Benigno G. Tabora (1915–2008), Filipino-American veteran of both World War II and the Korean War
Carlos Tábora (born 1965), Honduran footballer and manager
Joel Tabora (born 1947), Filipino Jesuit priest and university president
Krizziah Tabora (born 1991), Filipino bowler
Marlon Tábora Muñoz (born 1969), Honduran politician and diplomat 
Rocio Tábora (born 1964), Honduran politician

Spanish-language surnames